Lucea may refer to:
 Lucea, Jamaica, a coastal town
 Lucea East River, a river in Jamaica
 Lucea West River, a river in Jamaica
 Santa Lucea, a town of the Ais tribe, now St. Lucie Inlet, Florida